Nova is a former Ancient city and Roman bishopric, now in Tunisia (precise site unknown) and a Latin Catholic titular see.

History 
It was important enough in the Roman province of Africa Proconsularis, in the papal sway, to become one of the many suffragan dioceses of its capital's Metropolitan of Carthage, but faded like most.

It has two historically documented bishops :
 Rogatianus, participant at the Council of Carthage called in 256 by its saint Cyprian on the lapsi, Christians who accepted forced pagan sacrificing to avoid martyrdom
 Secondinus, who intervened at a council in Constantinople in 451.

 Titular see 
In 1933 the diocese was nominally restored as Latin titular bishopric of Nova (Latin and Curiate Italian) / Noven(sis) (Latin adjective). The title has been held by:
 Paul-Marie-Maurice Perrin (1964.07.09 – 1965.08.02)
 Francis John Spence (1967.04.01 – 1970.08.17)
 Johannes Kleineidam (1970.09.12 – death 1981.06.02) as Auxiliary Bishop of Berlin (Germany) (1970.09.12 – 1981.06.02)
 Lajos Bálint (1981.07.09 – 1990.03.14)
 Mario del Valle Moronta Rodríguez (1990.04.04 – 1995.12.02) as Auxiliary Bishop of Archdiocese of Caracas (Venezuela) (1990.04.04 – 1995.12.02), later Bishop of Los Teques (Venezuela) (1995.12.02 – 1999.04.14), Bishop of San Cristóbal de Venezuela (Venezuela) (1999.04.14 – ...), Second Vice-President of Episcopal Conference of Venezuela (2012.01.12 – ...)
 Luigi De Magistris (1996.03.06 – 2001.11.22)
 Juan Carlos Cárdenas Toro (2015.06.26 – ...), Auxiliary Bishop of Cali (Colombia), no previous prelature.

 See also 
 List of Catholic dioceses in Tunisia

 Sources and external links 
 GCatholic - data for all sections
 Bibliography
 J. Mesnage, L'Afrique chrétienne'', Paris 1912, p. 213

Catholic titular sees in Africa
Former Roman Catholic dioceses in Africa
Suppressed Roman Catholic dioceses